Neuvic or Neuvic-sur-l'Isle (Limousin: Nuòuvic) is a commune in the southwestern French department of Dordogne. Neuvic station has rail connections to Bordeaux, Périgueux, Brive-la-Gaillarde and Limoges.

Population

Sights
Parc botanique de Neuvic

See also
Communes of the Dordogne department

References

Communes of Dordogne